Juan Bustillo Oro (2 June 1904 – 10 June 1989) was a Mexican film director, screenwriter and producer, whose career spanned  over 38 years.

Among his works there are In the Times of Don Porfirio, Here's the Point, Arm in Arm Down the Street, Cuando los hijos se van and those listed below.

Selected filmography
Two Monks (1934)
The Black Angel (1942) 
My Memories of Mexico (1944)
Seven Women (1953)

References

External links

1904 births
1989 deaths
People from Mexico City
Mexican filmmakers
Mexican film directors
Mexican film producers
20th-century Mexican screenwriters
20th-century Mexican male writers